Thomas Gardner Ford Sr. (July 15, 1918 – August 28, 1995) was an American politician, businessman, and a younger half-brother of President Gerald Ford.

Biography
Born in Grand Rapids, Michigan, Ford served in the United States Army during World War II. He graduated from University of Michigan and worked at the Ford Paint and Varnish Company in Grand Rapids. He served on the Kent County, Michigan Board of Commissioners from 1958 to 1964. He represented the 91st District in the Michigan House of Representatives from 1964 to 1972 as a Republican. He then worked for the Michigan State Legislature in legislative audit from 1972 to 1980. He died in Johns Island, South Carolina. He was a half-brother of President Gerald Ford.

Notes

External links

1918 births
1995 deaths
Politicians from Grand Rapids, Michigan
University of Michigan alumni
Gerald Ford family
Military personnel from Michigan
Businesspeople from Grand Rapids, Michigan
County commissioners in Michigan
Republican Party members of the Michigan House of Representatives
20th-century American businesspeople
20th-century American politicians
United States Army personnel of World War II